Clifton County was one of the counties of New Zealand in the North Island. It became part of New Plymouth District in 1989.

See also 
 List of former territorial authorities in New Zealand § Counties

References

External links 
 1922 map

Counties of New Zealand